The 2018–19 Adelaide United W-League was the club's eleventh season in the W-League, the premier competition for women's football in Australia. The team played home games at Marden Sports Complex and Coopers Stadium. and were managed by Ivan Karlović.

Players

Squad information

Transfers in

Transfers out

W-League

League table

Fixtures

Results summary

Results by round

References

Adelaide United FC (A-League Women) seasons